Lisa Hedengren (born 14 February 1992) is a Swedish ice hockey player for AIK IF and the Swedish national team. She participated at the 2015 IIHF Women's World Championship.

References

1992 births
Living people
Swedish women's ice hockey forwards